Buchanan's Station was a fortified stockade featuring a bunkhouse, a way station, and a surrounding settlement established about 1784 in Davidson County on Mill Creek by Major John Buchanan in what is today the Donelson neighborhood of Nashville, Tennessee. It was the site of the critical 1792 Battle of Buchanan's Station during the Cherokee–American wars taking place in the late eighteenth century. J.G.M. Ramsey, the historian, referred to the battle and resultant victory as "...a feat of bravery which has scarcely been surpassed in all the annals of border warfare."

History
John Buchanan first came to the Washington District in early 1780, settling in the vicinity of Fort Nashboro. Buchanan left Fort Nashboro with a large party in the spring of 1784 and finally occupied his compound and settlement that had been constructed over the preceding three years and located just four miles southeast of the fort. It was situated between Mill Creek and what later became the Buchanan Mill Road near the intersection of two of the area's wilderness trails that led to Nashville. These were: the Lower Trace (an old buffalo trail that later became known as The Hermitage Road); and the old Indian road to Nickajack (being a segment of the Cisca & St. Augustine Indian Trail that ran southeast to Chickamauga Creek near today’s City of Chattanooga). Blazed in 1788, the First Holston Road became the third major travel artery that passed the bunkhouse on the way to Nashville. It ran across the Cumberland Plateau to Knoxville, the first direct overland route to the Mero District from the east. 

Buchanan's Station was about average in size for a fortified stockade in the Cumberland, enclosing roughly an acre. It comprised just a few buildings surrounded by a picket stockade that included a solidly-built blockhouse at the front gate, overlooking Mill Creek. The Buchanans and seven other families lived in small log houses within the enclosure. Some of the families also had slaves.

Early hostilities 
On May 8, 1786, Major Buchanan's brother Samuel left the station to plow the field near Mill Creek, when he was pursued and killed by a group of Native Americans, reportedly after jumping off the bluff. In 1787, Major Buchanan's father, John Buchanan Sr., was killed inside the fort with a tomahawk  in front of his wife Jane. According to geographer George William Featherstonhaugh, the incident occurred after the fort was taken by surprise by Cherokee and Choctaw Indians; other settlers killed in the attack included William Mulherrin. Still other casualties among the settlers in the years before the Battle of Buchanan Station included Cornelius Riddle and John Blackburn.

Battle of Buchanan's Station

Background
In early 1792, a delegation of Overhill Cherokee met with United States Secretary of War Henry Knox in Philadelphia. Among their demands was that white settlers abandon the Cumberland, the traditional hunting grounds for several tribes. Preoccupied with the Northwest Indian War, Knox was determined to avoid escalating conflict in the Southwest Territory, and tried to pacify the delegation by increasing the annuity paid to them under the Treaty of Holston.

In the face of ongoing raids by Chickamauga and Creek Indians, Governor William Blount and leaders of the militia in the Southwest Territory had petitioned Knox to send federal troops to the area. Knox agreed to provide only limited federal assistance. While authorizing more militia, arms, and ammunition for the Mero District, Knox insisted that the militia remain in a defensive posture only, and that any settlers encroaching on unceded lands in violation of the Treaty of Holston should be punished.

Meanwhile, raids by various tribes continued, emboldened by support from Hector, Baron de Carondelet, the Spanish governor of Louisiana, who wanted to halt American westward expansion. In May 1792, Governor Blount met with John Watts and other Cherokee leaders believing that they wanted peace, but Watts proceeded to meet with Spanish officials and planned further attacks.

Capture of Ziegler's Station 
On June 26, 1792, Ziegler's Station, roughly 30 miles northeast of Buchanan's Station, was attacked and captured by a war party of Shawnee, Cherokee, and Creek Indians, in a major setback for settlements in the Cumberland. The assault was led by Shawnee war chief Cheeseekau, the eldest brother of young Tecumseh, and Cherokee leader Little Owl, a brother of the late Dragging Canoe. Survivors of the attack were taken prisoner and most were eventually returned in exchange for ransom.

War council 
In early September 1792, John Watts called a council of Native American leaders in Willstown to discuss their next move. Despite having been advised by Arturo O'Neill, a Spanish official, to avoid taking aggressive action, Watts rallied the Chickamauga to go to war against the United States. Although he met with opposition from Bloody Fellow, one of the Cherokee delegates to Philadelphia, Cheeseekau and White Owl's Son both declared their support for Watts. 

At a subsequent meeting at Lookout Mountain, they developed a plan to strike Nashville on the Cumberland, instead of attacking the Holston settlements as was initially discussed.

Preparation 
By September 11, 1792, Governor Blount had received warnings about the Chickamauga plan to declare war from multiple sources, including Little Turkey, who wrote to Blount that the decision involved only the "five lower towns on the Big river" and did not have the consent of the whole Cherokee nation. Other informants included interpreters James Carey and John Thompson, as well as frontiersman James Ore, who reported hearing that a war party of 500, including 100 Creek Indians, was heading to the Cumberland. 

Blount immediately ordered General James Robertson to mobilize the militia in the Mero District. In the meantime, he received letters from Bloody Fellow and Chief Glass claiming that a war party had started to gather, but had been dispersed. Cherokee chief Unacata, also known as "White Man-killer", went so far as to visit Blount at his home in Knoxville and profess his friendship, before joining Watts on the war path. 

Persuaded that war was not imminent, Blount sent another letter to Robertson ordering him to dismiss the militia. Robertson, however, initially refused after receiving word from his own informants, Richard Findelstone and Jonathan Deraque, that Watts was lying. Robertson put the men under his command to work at Buchanan's Station, the dilapidated outpost four miles east of Nashville which was most exposed in the event of a strike on the town. There, the militia rebuilt the stockade, build new blockhouses, and install a "new heavy gate". 

The march from the lower towns of the Tennessee River to the Cumberland should have only taken five or six days at the most, but two weeks passed with no sign of an Indian war party on its way. The reason for the delay has been the subject of much speculation, and may never be known. Blount later wrote, "Difference of opinion, as the mode and place of attack, at the rendezvous after they passed at the Tennessee, probably was the cause of the delay; I have no other way to account for it", pointing out that this was often the case when more than one nation was involved. One popular theory is that Watts wanted to strike Nashville first to preserve an element of surprise, while Cheeseekau and Creek chief Talotiskee insisted on attacking Buchanan's Station first to avoid leaving an armed, newly refortified garrison in their rear. Another explanation was that the chiefs had been waiting for their own scouts to return with intelligence.

On September 28 or 29, Robertson finally dismissed the militia. Historian Elizabeth Ellet wrote that many of the militia members were relieved to return to their own stations, but also felt trepidation about possible hostilities to follow.

Prelude 
Concerned for the safety of the stockade, Major Buchanan convinced a handful of men from the militia to remain at Buchanan's Station to keep watch for a few extra days. He confided only in his wife Sally Buchanan about the extent of his fears, worried that the nineteen men residing there would abandon Buchanan's Station for safer outposts. On the day the militia left, Buchanan sent out two scouts, Jonathan Gee and Clayton Powell, to find out what they could, but Gee and Powell did not return.

The Indians who attacked the settlement probably approached the station via the Nickajack Trail, where they had left a path of destroyed homesteads on their way up the trail from Chickamauga country. A group of about 60 led by Doublehead (Tal-tsu'tsa) ambushed a party of six and took one scalp. They then continued on toward Nashville. On their way, they were attacked by a small militia force and lost 13 men.

Battle
The Battle of Buchanan’s Station took place on the night of September 30, 1792, at which time the settlement was attacked by a combined force of over 300{{efn|Some historian estimates of the size of the attacking forces are considerably higher—going up to 900 participants. The actual figure was likely no more than 400.<ref Name= "wrrior">M'Elwee, W. E. THE OLD ROAD,’ : From Washington and Hamilton Districts to the Cumberland Settlement; "The American Historical Magazine and Tennessee Historical Society Quarterly"; vol. 8, no. 4; (1903): 347–54; retrieved February 2023; [http://www.jstor.org/stable/45331995 via jstor]; quote: "...the Creek division was commanded by Talotiskee, of the Broken Arrow, the great friend of Bowles. He is not to be confounded with Talotiskee, the cousin of Watts, who was not with the invading army..."</ref>}} Lower Cherokee, Shawnee, and Creek Indians. The station's unsuspecting defenders suffered no fatalities during the attack, although the occupants numbered only 35 to 40 that night, with just about half that number able to shoot. Two scouts who had been sent out earlier to reconnoiter the Nickajack Trail, however, were found dead after the battle.Slate, Mike; Buchanan's Station : The battle that saved the Cumberland settlements; WebPage; Nashville Historical Newsletter online; retrieved December 2022

Standing guard that night, farmer John McCrory alerted the occupants to danger when he fired the first shot of the battle—a shot fatal to one of the war party's leaders, the war chief known at the battle as Shawnee Warrior (who was in fact Tecumseh’s older brother, Cheeseekau, or Chiksika). The well-planned and fortified bunkhouse was equipped with portholes from which its defenders could send repeated volleys of musket and rifle fire upon the attackers. Thus, the small force could successfully resist the invaders' over-whelming numbers, as unmolested approach to the building was almost impossible. Due to the concerted efforts of its occupants, as few as 15, but no more than 20, frontier sharpshooters enclosed therein held off the overwhelming Indian force, while the women supported the defenders by loading firearms and feeding the men fresh ammunition, some of which was newly molded from leaden tableware that was on-hand. Sally Buchanan, John's young wife who was at that point nine months pregnant, rallied and organized the women, children, and slaves present to support the defending riflemen with food, alcohol, and ammunition.

Several attempts to set fire to the building were also foiled. One Cherokee warrior, Kiachatalle died with a torch in his hand as he repeatedly tried to set fire to the building, even while fatally wounded. Well into the battle, one of the blockhouse's defenders, Jemmy O'Connor, an Irishman who had become inebriated during the fight, over-filled a blunderbuss and fired at the attackers through a porthole. The gun blew up instead. The resultant explosion so terrified the Indians they quickly scattered, thinking the fort defenders had brought the use of a cannon into the melee, thus ending the battle.

Aftermath
The attack against the station, that had lasted just over an hour, was repulsed, and the Native American force broke up into smaller raiding parties that wrecked havoc on the farmsteads in the surrounding area. The main objective of wiping out Nashville, however, was abandoned. The battle was costly to the raiding parties: Talotiskee was killed, along with Unacata, Cheeseekau, and about 25 others (all together, about 10% of the original raiding party). Another Cherokee warrior, Little Owl (son of White Owl, a possible brother to the recently deceased leader of the Chickamauga, Dragging Canoe (Tsiyu Gansini) )—was also killed. Watts, the current headman of the Lower Cherokee and future Cherokee National Chief, was gravely wounded (shot through both legs), but survived.Slate, Mike; Preserving Nashville’s Pioneer Legacy, Part II: The Role of John and Sally Buchanan in Nashville History; Nashville Historical Newsletter; retrieved March 2023

The remainder of Talotiskee's party stayed out into early October, attacking Black's Station on Crooked Creek, where they killed three men, wounded several more, and captured several horses. Chief Middle Striker's party, numbering 54, meanwhile, ambushed a large armed force coming into the Mero District down the Walton Road and routed it completely—without losing a single man. In revenge for the deaths at Buchanan's Station, Bob Benge, Doublehead, and his brother Pumpkin Boy led a party of about 60 warriors into southwestern Kentucky, where they attacked several settlements. One notable Native American who fought in the battle included an unknown Shawnee warrior at that time named Tecumseh. Although Tecumseh survived, his older brother Chiksika was killed.

After the battle, Sally Buchanan became widely known as "the greatest Heroine of the West" due to her determined leadership and aid to the fort's defense during the conflict.Ellet, Elizabeth F.; The Women of the American Revolution, Vol. III; New York: Charles Scribner; (1856); pp. 310-327

Later development
 

Major Buchanan continued to add infrastructure to his settlement after the events of 1792. He added a two-story log cabin that included a large hall and parlor about 1807. According to its entry in the National Register of Historic Places (NRHP), "...the house displays a high level of craftmanship and is one of the best examples of two-story log construction in Middle Tennessee..." The log house was further expanded in the 1820s to include a pen log addition due to the expanding family, at that time numbering 16 children plus the parents.

Major Buchanan died in 1832, and his son, Richard, sold the property in 1841 to Ralph Smith, who demolished much of the compound and built a plantation on the site, itself later razed.Trabue, Laurence O.; Early Nashville Homes, 1780–1830; via "Nashville Families & Homes: Paragraphs from the Nashville History Lecture Series, 1979–81"; Graham, E.; and Hearne, M.G.; The Nashville Public Library; Nashville, Tennessee; (1983); p. 111 The Buchanan Station log house, however, was restored in 1984 and was placed in the NRHP, though not at the original site, as the land today is covered by a large industrial compound.

Legacy
A roadside plaque marks the spot of the settlement. Today, the only remains of the settlement is the still extant cemetery that holds the identifiable graves of about 65 family, friends, settlers, and slaves (including those of John and Sally Buchanan). At least five of the settlement's residents who had been killed by Indians before the battle are also buried here.

See also
 Natchez Trace
 Nickajack Expedition

Notes

References

Further reading
 Buchanan, John; Jackson’s Way: Andrew Jackson and the People of the Western Waters; Hoboken, New Jersey; John Wiley & Sons; (2001); reprint by Castle Books
 Caruso, John Anthony; The Appalachian Frontier: America’s First Surge Westward; Knoxville: University of Tennessee Press; (2003); (The new edition of the 1959 original edition)
 Meyer, William E. Meyer; Indian Trails of the Southeast''; Davenport Iowa: Gustav’s Library, (2009); Reprint from the "Forty-second Annual Report of the Bureau of American Ethnology" 1924-25; (see especially the included maps)

Buchanan's Station
History of Nashville, Tennessee
Tourist attractions in Nashville, Tennessee
Pre-statehood history of Tennessee
Buildings and structures in Nashville, Tennessee
1784 establishments in North Carolina